Events in the year 1941 in Spain.

Incumbents
Caudillo: Francisco Franco

Births
February 8 - Elena Santiago, writer. (d. 2021)
March 5 - José Luis Arilla, tennis player.
November 18 – Marta Pessarrodona, poet, literary critic, essayist, biographer

Deaths
February 28 - Alfonso XIII of Spain, former King of Spain (d. 1886)

Historical events 

 February 15-16 - a fire in the city of Santander (Cantabria) in 1941, which destroyed most of the medieval town.

Establishments

 Instituto Nacional de Industria

See also
List of Spanish films of the 1940s

References

 
Years of the 20th century in Spain
1940s in Spain
Spain
Spain